Ruth Harrison (10 May 1909 – 1991) was an English snooker and billiards player. She won the Women's Professional Snooker Championship each year from its inception in 1934 to 1940, and again when it was next held, in 1948. She also won the Women's Professional Billiards Championship three times.

Biography

Harrison was born on 10 May 1909 in Lintz and was a coalminer's daughter (as was her fellow leading player Agnes Morris) and learnt to play at the institute in her village in County Durham.

She entered the 1931 World Ladies Billiards Championship, which was the first time she had played against women, and won the tournament. She turned professional straight afterwards. When the Women's Billiards Association was formed in 1931, Harrison was one of the four professional players appointed to a committee to organise the professional championships, along with Margaret Lennan, Eva Collins and Joyce Gardner.

She won the Women's Professional Snooker Championship each year from its inception in 1934 to 1940, and again when it was held after an interval of several years, in 1948.

Harrison also won the Women's Professional Billiards Championship three times, in 1934, 1935, and 1939. Her break of 197 in the 1937 championship is still the women's world record break in competition.

She received coaching from Willie Smith and Sidney Smith.
Harrison qualified as a referee for billiard and snooker in 1937.

She died in 1991, aged 82.

Titles and achievements
Snooker

Billiards

References

External links
Sportshots No. 9 – Billiards – For Ladies! British Pathe film segment featuring Harrison.

English snooker players
1909 births
Female snooker players
Female players of English billiards
English players of English billiards
World champions in English billiards
Year of death missing
Sportspeople from County Durham
People from Burnopfield